The 1985–86 ACB season was the 3rd season of the ACB Primera División, the top Spanish professional basketball league. It started on 21 September 1985 with the first round of the regular season and ended on 10 May 1986 with the finals.

Real Madrid won their third consecutive ACB title, and their 25th Spanish title.

Teams

Promotion and relegation (pre-season)
A total of 16 teams contested the league, including 13 sides from the 1984–85 season and three promoted from the 1984–85 Primera División B.

Teams promoted from Primera División B
Magia de Huesca
Claret Las Palmas
TDK Manresa

Venues and locations

First phase

Group Odd

Group Even

Second phase

Group A1

Group A2

Playoffs

Championship playoffs

Source: Linguasport

Relegation playoffs

Source: Linguasport

Final standings

External links
 Official website 
 Linguasport 

 
Spanish
Liga ACB seasons